Green Lake is the larger of the two lakes in Green Lakes State Park, which lies about  east of downtown Syracuse in Onondaga County, New York. Round Lake is the smaller lake located west of Green Lake. Both lakes are meromictic, which means no seasonal mixing of surface and bottom waters occurs. Meromictic lakes are fairly rare; they have been extensively studied, in part because their sediments can preserve a historical record extending back thousands of years, and because of the euxinic (anoxic, sulfidic) conditions which can form in the deep water.

Description
Green Lake has a maximum depth of 195 feet (59 metres). Deep lakes tend to appear bluish because the wavelengths of light that can penetrate (and be dispersed at) great depths are those closer to the blue end of the spectrum. Because of its depth and the high salinity of the basin waters, the lake is meromictic and does not turn over and intermix waters like many other lakes in this region do. Green Lake's cold and dense bottom waters tend to stay separate from the shallower, warmer waters. Because of this, sediment sinks and collects in the bottom and undergoes virtually no decay. Since the sediment is not disturbed by mixing, the lake does not take on a muddy, turbid appearance like other lakes do. Meromictic lakes also have still, mirror-like waters. Green Lake's tranquil, reflective water makes it photogenic.  The lake is glacial in origin, likely developed by glacial meltwater during the most recent North American glaciation. Its calcium and sulfate-rich waters are due to groundwater percolating through marine shale with a high gypsum content. The lake, which resembles a large river in shape, is unusually deep for its size and was considered sacred by the native Onondaga tribe, which originally settled in the area.

Fishing
Fish species present in the lake include rainbow trout, pumpkinseed sunfish, and brook trout. Access is only by rental boats or shore fishing.

History
Fayetteville Green Lake (FGL) was the first lake in North America identified as meromictic, and is the best-studied meromictic lake in the world, with records dating back to 1839.  Green Lake was referred to as Lake Sodom by Lardner Vanuxem, who was the first to study Green Lake in 1839, and the presence of sulfide in the deeper waters of the lake was known by 1849.  FGL is believed to have formed as a plunge pool during the late Wisconsin stage of glaciation at the base of a waterfall formed by the retreating glaciers, which is the reason for its extreme depth relative to a small surface area. The outflow for FGL runs underneath the Erie Canal, which is located within 300 m of the north shore of the lake.  FGL is currently located in Green Lakes State Park, and since 1933, large quantities of sand have been dumped on the shore of the north end to create a swimming area.

Biogeochemistry

Fayetteville Green Lake is located in the Oswego River-Lake Ontario drainage system, and receives surface water from Round Lake.   The water column is chemically stratified into an oxygenated upper portion (mixolimnion) and a euxinic deeper portion (monimolimnion).  The stratification is maintained through the large input of ground water rich in dissolved solids to the deeper portion of the lake.  The difference in the dissolved solids (Ca, Mg, SO4) between the water input to the surface and water input to the deep creates the permanent stratification observed.  FGL has a sulfate concentration around 13.5 mmol/L (about half that of modern seawater) which is derived from groundwater input to the deep portion of the lake.  A well-developed separation in a body of water due to differing chemistries is present between 18 and 20 m depth. The water below the chemocline is anoxic and sulfidic, and at the chemocline is a dense layer of purple sulfur bacteria which makes the water appear pink.  The purple sulfur bacteria thrive in the anoxic waters and use the sulfide from the deeper water in their chemosynthesis.
The color of the lake is created by the total dissolved solids (from the groundwater input) which disperse the sunlight creating a greenish color.  Annual whiting events occur in FGL, due to the large Synechococcus population in the lake.  Calcite precipitates in microenvironments surrounding the Synechococcus and this is believed to dominate the whiting events.  Calcite precipitation is common year round at FGL, and this leads to the carbonate crust that surrounds most of the lake, and covers branches and other material that falls below the surface.  Dead Man's Point is a notable example of this, and is classified as a thrombolitic bioherm.

Geologic significance

The meromictic character of FGL is believed to represent a possible analog to ancient ocean environments during the Precambrian and during times of environmental stress. (i.e. mass extinction events).  During these times, the oceans may have become anoxic and possibly sulfidic in the deep water. Information about past environments can be gained through studying isotopic, chemical, and biological compositions of modern FGL.  FGL is the subject of multiple scientific studies per year.  Recent work by Lee Kump at Penn State University has been featured on the television shows Nova: scienceNOW, National Geographic, and BBC  relating FGL to the end-Permian mass extinction.

References

External links
"The Underwater World of Green Lakes", video obtained using a robotic submarine by Dr. Mark A. Teece

Lakes of New York (state)
Meromictic lakes
Lakes of Onondaga County, New York